The 2007 season of the 3. divisjon, the fourth highest association football league for men in Norway.

Between 18 and 26 games (depending on group size) were played in 24 groups, with 3 points given for wins and 1 for draws. Twelve teams were promoted to the 2. divisjon through playoff.

Tables 

Oslo 1
Lyn 2 – won playoff
KFUM
Grei
Skeid 2
Grorud
Nordstrand
Lommedalen
Bygdø Monolitten
Vestli
Lille Tøyen
Teisen – relegated
Andes – pulled team

Oslo 2
Frigg – lost playoff
St. Hanshaugen – relegated (voluntarily)
Oslo City
Follo 2
Nesodden
Heming
Sagene
Vollen
Bærum 2
Kolbotn
Rommen
Hauger – relegated

Oslo 3
Grüner – lost playoff
Ullern
Bøler
Årvoll
Asker 2
Kjelsås 2
Fagerborg
Kurer
Klemetsrud
Røa
Øvrevoll/Hosle
Fossum – relegated

Akershus
Skjetten – won playoff
Høland
Fjellhamar
Fet
Lørenskog 2
Bjerke
Eidsvold
Lillestrøm 3
Skedsmo
Funnefoss/Vormsund
Ull/Kisa 2
Aurskog/Finstadbru
Bjørkelangen – relegated
Blaker – relegated

Indre Østland 1
Raufoss 2
Valdres – won playoff
Brumunddal
Kolbu/KK
Ringsaker
Vardal
Redalen
Toten
Gjøvik-Lyn 2 – relegated
Ringebu/Fåvang – relegated
FF Lillehammer 2 – relegated
Ihle – relegated

Indre Østland 2
Kongsvinger 2
Ham-Kam 2 – lost playoff
Sander
Stange
Flisa
Elverum
Hadeland
Løten
Hamar
Trysil – relegated
Grue – relegated
Galterud – relegated

Buskerud
Strømsgodset 2 – won playoff
Birkebeineren
Åskollen
Åssiden
Kongsberg
Konnerud
Jevnaker
Hønefoss BK 2
Mjøndalen 2
Solberg
Svelvik
ROS – relegated

Østfold
Østsiden – won playoff
Kvik/Halden
Lisleby
Mysen
Sparta Sarpsborg 2
Hærland
Moss 2
Sprint-Jeløy 2 – relegated
Ås
Borgar
Greåker
Rygge
Trøgstad/Båstad
Gresvik – relegated

Vestfold
Fram Larvik – lost playoff
Sandar
Sandefjord 2
Ørn-Horten
Larvik Turn
Eik-Tønsberg
Flint
Falk
Svarstad
Tønsberg FK
Borre – relegated
Runar – relegated

Telemark
Tollnes – lost playoff
Skarphedin
Pors Grenland 2
Sannidal
Herkules
Urædd
Notodden 2
Skotfoss
Kjapp
Stathelle (-> Langesund/Stathelle)
Brevik
Gvarv – relegated

Agder
Vindbjart – won playoff
Trauma
Giv Akt
Våg
Søgne
Donn
Vigør
Tveit
Lyngdal
Mandalskameratene 2
Jerv
Flekkefjord/Kvinesdal – relegated
Start 3 – relegated
Grane – relegated

Rogaland 1
Randaberg – won playoff
Vardeneset
Bryne 2
Staal Jørpeland
Vaulen
Klepp
Buøy
Ålgård 2
Egersund
Frøyland
Nærbø
Ganddal
Sola
Bjerkreim – relegated

Rogaland 2
Kopervik – lost playoff
Vidar
Åkra
Haugesund 2
Djerv 1919
Skjold
Avaldsnes
Nord
Vard Haugesund 2
Sandnes Ulf 2
Vedavåg Karmøy
Sandved
Varhaug – relegated
Torvastad – relegated

Hordaland 1
Trio – lost playoff
Hovding
Vadmyra
Loddefjord
Follese
Øygard
Stord
Austevoll
Norheimsund
Lyngbø
Bremnes – relegated
Fitjar – relegated

Hordaland 2
Nest-Sotra – won playoff
Voss
Hald
Baune
Brann 2
Varegg
Arna-Bjørnar
Bergen Nord
Frøya
Sandviken
Ny-Krohnborg – relegated
Radøy/Manger – relegated

Sogn og Fjordane
Årdal – lost playoff
Sogndal 2
Førde
Stryn
Kaupanger
Florø
Fjøra
Tornado Måløy
Høyang
Eid
Dale – relegated
Eikefjord – relegated

Sunnmøre
Skarbøvik – won playoff
Brattvåg
Aalesund 2
Hareid
Hødd 2
Volda
Langevåg
Sykkylven
Spjelkavik
Valder
Blindheim
Ørsta – relegated

Nordmøre og Romsdal
Træff – lost playoff
Sunndal
Elnesvågen/Omegn
Molde 2
Kristiansund 2
Dahle
Måndalen
Rival
Surnadal
Vestnes Varfjell – relegated
Kristiansund – relegated
Midsund – relegated

Trøndelag 1
KIL/Hemne – won playoff
Ranheim 2
Tynset
NTNUI
Orkla
Melhus
Rosenborg 3
Flå
Nidelv
Rissa
Charlottenlund – relegated
Buvik – relegated

Trøndelag 2
Strindheim 2
Verdal – lost playoff
Stjørdals-Blink
Kolstad
Levanger 2
Namsos
Tiller
Neset
Vuku
Kattem
Rørvik – relegated
Malvik – relegated

Nordland
Innstranden – lost playoff
Steigen
Stålkameratene
Mosjøen
Fauske/Sprint
Bodø/Glimt 2
Tverlandet
Mo 2
Bossmo/Ytteren
Herøy/Dønna
Halsøy – relegated
Brønnøysund – relegated

Hålogaland
Lofoten – won playoff
Sortland
Landsås
Leknes
Harstad 2 – relegated
Skånland
Grovfjord
Medkila
Hardhaus
Morild – relegated

Troms
Senja – won playoff
Fløya
Skjervøy
Lyngen/Karnes
Ishavsbyen
Kvaløysletta
Finnsnes
Bardu – relegated (voluntarily)
Tromsdalen 2
Salangen
Skarp 2 – relegated (voluntarily)
Ramfjord

Finnmark
Kirkenes – lost playoff
Bossekop
Porsanger
Sørøy/Glimt
Alta 2
Kautokeino
Norild
Båtsfjord
Hammerfest 2 – relegated
Nordlys
Tverrelvdalen

Playoffs

References

Norwegian Third Division seasons
4
Norway
Norway